Tonna zonata is a species of large sea snail, a marine gastropod mollusk in the family Tonnidae, the tun shells.

Description
The length of the shell varies between 100 mm and 280 mm.

Distribution
This marine species has a wide distribution : East China Sea, South China Sea, the Philippines, Indonesia, Japan and New Zealand.

References

 Leung KF. & Morton B. (2000). The 1998 resurvey of the subtidal molluscan community of the southeastern waters of Hong Kong, six years after dredging began and three since it ended.In: Proceedings of the Tenth International Marine Biological Workshop: Morton B, editor. The Marine Flora and Fauna of Hong Kong and Southern China. The marine flora and fauna of Hong Kong and southern China V. Hong Kong University Press, Hong Kong. pp 553-617.
 Vos, C. (2007) A conchological Iconography (No. 13) - The family Tonnidae. 123 pp., 30 numb. plus 41 (1 col.) un-numb. text-figs, 33 maps., 63 col. pls, Conchbooks, Germany
 Vos, C. (2008) Tonnidae. in Poppe G.T. (ed.) Philippine Marine Mollusks, Volume 1: Gastropoda 1: 594-611, pls 242-250. Conchbooks, Hackenheim, Germany.
 Cernohorsky. W. O. (1972). Marine Shells of the Pacific. Vol. II. Pacific Publications, Sydney, 411 pp.
 Vos, C. (2012) Overview of the Tonnidae (MOLLUSCA: GASTROPODA) in Chinese waters. Shell Discoveries 1(1); pp. 12-22; Pls. 1-9
 Vos, C. (2013) Overview of the Tonnidae (Mollusca: Gastropoda) in Chinese waters. Gloria Maris 52(1-2); pp. 22-53; Pls. 1-9

External links
 Green, J. (1830). The Dolia of the United States. Transactions of the Albany Institute, New York. 1: 131-133
 Philippi, R. A. (1845). Diagnoses testaceorum quorundam novorum. Zeitschrift für Malakozoologie. 2(10): 147-152

Tonnidae
Gastropods described in 1830